Melanogaster is a genus of hoverflies.

Species
M. aerosa (Loew, 1843)
M. curvistylus Vujic & Stuke, 1998
M. hirtella (Loew, 1843)
M. inornata (Loew, 1854)
M. jaroslavensis (Stackelberg, 1922)
M. nigricans (Stackelberg, 1922)
M. nuda (Macquart, 1829)
M. parumplicata (Loew, 1840)
M. pollinifacies (Violovitsh, 1956)
M. stackelbergi (Violovitsh, 1978)
M. tumescens (Loew, 1873)

References

Diptera of Europe
Hoverfly genera
Eristalinae
Taxa named by Camillo Rondani